Trasobares is a municipality located in the Aranda Comarca, province of Zaragoza, Aragon, Spain. According to the 2004 census (INE), the municipality has a population of 183 inhabitants.

This town is located in the SW of the Moncayo Massif.

References

External links

Sierra de la Virgen - Hoces del Jalón

Municipalities in the Province of Zaragoza